Jonas (c. 760–843) was Bishop of Orléans and played a major political role during the reign of Emperor Louis the Pious.

Jonas was born in Aquitaine. Probably a cleric by the 780s, he served at the court of Louis the Pious, who ruled as King of Aquitaine during the reign of his father, Charlemagne.  In 817, Louis established his son Pippin as King of Aquitaine. Jonas served as an adviser to Pippin. The following year, Jonas was appointed Bishop of Orléans.

Jonas was a trusted servant of Emperor Louis, and a committed supporter of the Emperor in his conflicts with his sons.  He also wrote to refute some of the iconoclastic teachings of Claudius of Turin at the request of the emperor. At the ecclesiastical council held in Paris in 825, Jonas presented the position of the Frankish clergy on Iconoclasm to Pope Eugenius II. He later wrote the treatise De cultu imaginum on the question. At a council in 829, again at Paris, he was a supporter of the rights of the Emperor over the clergy. He participated in councils at Worms in 833, Thionville in 835, and Aachen in 836.

Jonas's writings included De Institutione laicali, an early example of mirror-of-princes writing, written for Matfrid, Count of Orléans. De Institutione regia, another mirror work, was written for Pippin of Aquitaine.

References
  Riché, Pierre, Dictionnaire des Francs: Les Carolingiens. Bartillat, 1997.

Further reading
  Jonas d'Orléans, Le metier du roi: De institutione regia, ed. & trans. A. Dubreucq. Cerf, 1995  (Sources Chrétiennes no.407). 
              Jonas d' Orléans Instruction des Laïcs ed. & trans. A. Dubreucq. Cerf, 2013 (Sources Chrétiennes, Nos. 549 & 560)

External links
Opera Omnia by Migne Patrologia Latina with analytical indexes

760s births
841 deaths
Bishops in the Carolingian Empire
Bishops of Orléans
Saints from the Carolingian Empire
9th-century Latin writers
Writers from the Carolingian Empire